The Inevitable End is the fifth studio album by Norwegian electronic music duo Röyksopp, released on 7 November 2014 by Dog Triumph. Svein Berge stated the album has a "dark energy", while Robyn described the album as "sad, but it's not cold. It's very warm." Four singles were released from the album: "Monument" (T.I.E. Version), "Skulls", "Sordid Affair" and "I Had This Thing".

In September 2014, the duo announced that The Inevitable End would be their final studio album in the traditional sense, adding that they are "not going to stop making music, but the album format as such, this is the last thing from us". In 2022, the duo announced a new "musical project" entitled Profound Mysteries, and that album was released on 29 April 2022.

Critical reception

The Inevitable End received generally positive reviews from music critics. At Metacritic, which assigns a normalised rating out of 100 to reviews from mainstream publications, the album received an average score of 75, based on 20 reviews. Madison Vain of Entertainment Weekly noted that the album "showcase[s] the best of the duo's trance-y instrumentals, propulsive hooks, and bubbling beats." Scott Simpson of Exclaim! opined that Röyksopp "have recorded the best final album they could have envisioned: a layered and cohesive package of enveloping synths filled with addictive hooks." Timothy Monger of AllMusic viewed the album as "a strong finale in the duo's signature style and whether or not this truly is the end or merely the end of their album era, The Inevitable End sits among the best in Röyksopp's catalog." Billboards Jamieson Cox stated that the duo were "leaving on a high note" and lauded the album as "sublime melancholy electro-pop, rich and emotionally resonant without feeling maudlin." Ryan Lathan of PopMatters called the album "gorgeously produced" and wrote that it "will never be looked upon as a terribly uplifting experience, but its lyrical content treats heartache, despair, self-hatred, remorse, depression, and the fear of the unknown with utter respect."

Franklin Jones of Slant Magazine commented, "Though the album doesn't skimp on potentially insufferable moments of bottom-lip-biting farewell [...] the best tracks boast a fiercely renewed energy that suggests Berge and Brundtland still have much more to offer." Corinne Jones of The Observer remarked that "[t]he best songs have a dark, brooding quality: the Norwegian duo's once naive sound has evolved to a smarter, more lyrically resonant electronica, and if it weren't for a couple of whimsical ballads, this would be a powerful, cohesive goodbye." At The Guardian, Michael Hann found that The Inevitable End "embodies [Röyksopp's] strengths and [...] weaknesses"; he cited "Running to the Sea" and "Sordid Affair" as standouts from the album, but felt that the album contains "too much drift". Pitchforks Marc Hogan expressed, "Despite capable guest vocalists, including Robyn herself, [the album is] generally devoted to glossy, bittersweet electronic drifts that are too slow, too long, or too bland to hold interest for 60 minutes, though often unobjectionable in smaller servings." Phil Hebblethwaite of NME characterised the album as "the sound of a band once introspective but alive, now lost, depressed and completely unavailable."

Commercial performance
The Inevitable End debuted at number 38 on the UK Albums Chart, selling 3,487 copies in its first week. In the United States, the album entered the Billboard 200 at number 103 and the Dance/Electronic Albums chart at number two, with first-week sales of 4,000 copies.

Track listing

Personnel
Credits adapted from the liner notes of The Inevitable End.

 Röyksopp – production, instruments, mastering ; vocals ; artwork
 Robyn – vocals 
 Man Without Country (Ryan James) – vocals 
 Susanne Sundfør – vocals ; additional vocal effects 
 Jamie Irrepressible – vocals 
 Kato Ådland – guitar 
 Davide Rossi – strings, string arrangements 
 Walter Coelho – mastering 
 Mike Marsh – mastering 
 Arnau Pi – artwork
 Stian Andersen – photo of Juliane S

Charts

Release history

References

2014 albums
Cherrytree Records albums
Interscope Records albums
Polydor Records albums
Röyksopp albums
Wall of Sound (record label) albums